Seul-ki, also spelled Seul-gi or Sul-ki, is a Korean unisex given name, predominantly feminine. It was the 8th-most popular name for baby girls born in South Korea in 1990. Unlike most Korean names, it does not have any Sino-Korean roots, but is an indigenous Korean language word meaning "wisdom". It is one of a number of such native names (called 고유어 이름) that have been becoming more popular in South Korea in recent decades.

People with this name include:

Sportspeople
Bae Seul-ki (footballer) (born 1985), South Korean male football centre back
Go Seul-ki (born 1986), South Korean male football forward
Lee Seul-gi (born 1986), South Korean male football midfielder
Catherine Kang (Korean name Kang Seul-ki, born 1987), South Korean-born Central African female taekwondo practitioner
Jung Seul-ki (born 1988), South Korean female swimmer
Cheon Seul-ki (born 1989), South Korean female field hockey player
Ahn Seul-ki (born 1992), South Korean female long-distance runner
Kim Seul-ki (born 1992), South Korean male football winger

Entertainers
Kang Eun-tak (born Shin Seul-gi, 1982), South Korean actor 
Bae Seul-ki (born 1986), South Korean female pop singer
Kim Seul-gi (born 1991), South Korean actress
Kang Seul-gi (born 1994), South Korean female pop singer, member of girl group Red Velvet

See also
List of Korean given names

References

Korean unisex given names